Jackie Sharkey or Jack Sharkey (born Giovanni Cervati) was an Italian-born American boxer who made a claim to the World Bantamweight Title on August 15, 1919, defeating reigning champion Pete Herman in a ten-round, no-decision bout in Milwaukee, Wisconsin. His claim to the title was not universally recognized at the time. Jack Sharkey, also known as Little Jackie Sharkey, should not be confused with the heavyweight champion Jack Sharkey.

Early life and career
Jackie Sharkey was born Giovanni Cervati in Bologna, Emilia Romagna, Italy on June 20, 1897, though he would live most of his life in New York City. In his early professional career between May 23, 1914, and February 21, 1916, fighting almost exclusively in the New York area, he won three and lost six bouts, with one draw.

On February 21, 1916, Sharkey lost to Jewish boxer Abe Friedman at the Olympia Boxing Club in New York in a ten-round newspaper decision. Friedman would become a competent bantamweight fringe contender during his career taking the USA New England Bantamweight Title in 1921.

On June 2, 1916, Sharkey lost to Young Zulu Kid in a fifth-round knockout at the Vanderbilt Athletic Club in Brooklyn, New York. By that year, Zulu Kid had established himself as a serious world flyweight contender.

Draw with Johnny Coulon, February 1917
On February 5, 1917, Sharkey drew with former World Bantamweight champion Johnny Coulon in a ten-round newspaper decision at the Pioneer Sporting Club in New York. Local newspapers disagreed on the decision. Coulon held the World Bantamweight Championship from 1911 to 1913, though the title was not unified at the time.

On July 27, 1917, Sharkey first lost to Kid Williams in six rounds at Oriole Park in Baltimore, at least by the newspaper decision of the Baltimore Sun. He lost to Williams again on April 1, 1918, in a twelve-round points decision at the Lyric Theater in Baltimore. Williams held the World Bantamweight Title from June 1914 to January 1917.

Bouts with December 1920 World Bantamweight Champion Joe Lynch 1916–25
Sharkey first met Joe Lynch on September 26, 1916, in the star bout at the Pioneer Sporting Club in New York, losing in ten-round newspaper decisions of the New York Times and New York Tribune. They met on February 27, 1917, and Sharkey lost again by a ten-round decision of three New York newspapers at the Pioneer Sports Club in New York City. Sharkey was down in the fifth round, after which Lynch had little trouble penetrating his defenses. The bout was an elimination series for the bantamweight championship, and Lynch had some difficulty with Sharkey in the early rounds.

Sharky and Joe Lynch drew in a fifteen-round points decision at New York's Madison Square Garden on September 28, 1920, although Lynch was down in several rounds from the blows of Sharkey. Sharkey's ability to stay fifteen rounds with a top bantamweight contender put him squarely in the list of top contenders himself. On December 2, 1920, in a somewhat more historic bout, Lynch defeated Sharkey in a fifteenth-round knockout at Madison Square Garden. Sharkey had the better of the bout up until the sixth round, when Lynch became far more dominant. Lynch's win gave him the right to challenge Pete Herman for the Bantamweight Championship three weeks later. On July 2, 1925, at the Polo Grounds in New York, home of the New York Giants, the two drew in four rounds to a large house in which Lynch was somewhat favored to win.

Seven bouts with top bantamweight contender Frankie Burns, 1916–18

Sharkey met Frankie Burns seven times during his career, but had little luck with the highly rated bantamweight contender.  Beginning on November 27, 1916, Sharkey faced a ten-round loss by newspaper decision from Burns in New York, followed by a ten-round loss on February 9, 1917, at the Harlem Sports Club in New York by newspaper decision of the New York Sun. Sharkey sank to the mat in the sixth round and claimed a foul, though he recovered by the seventh. He fought the first two rounds "like a whirlwind" and looked to have an advantage, but lost his pace in subsequent rounds. In the third, Sharkey was stunned by a left hook to his midriff that may have affected him for the remainder of the bout.

On October 15, 1917, he lost to Burns in a newspaper decision ten rounder in Albany, New York.  Burns was "too clever" for Sharkey and "won by use of constant left jabs and right handers to the body".  Sharkey fell to a ten-round loss by newspaper decision in Scranton, Pennsylvania, on February 21, 1918. In their February 21 Jersey City Town Hall bout, Burns was described as easily outpointing his opponent, and taking seven of the ten rounds, with only one to Sharkey before a substantial house of 4000. On June 20, 1918, he drew with Burns in a six-round newspaper decision in Madison Square Garden, and he lost to Burns again at the Garden in their last bout on November 16 in a six-round newspaper decision of the New York Times. Burns was eight years older than Sharkey, but seemed a difficult opponent to defeat.  On July 13, 1920, Sharkey lost to Burns in a twelve-round newspaper decision of the Philadelphia Record at the Outdoor Arena of the Armory in Jersey City, New Jersey. As a highly rated Bantamweight, Burns contended four times for the World Bantamweight Championship between 1912 and 1917.

On April 6, 1918, Sharkey defeated Joe Tuber at the National Athletic Club in Philadelphia in a six-round newspaper decision of the Philadelphia Inquirer.  The bout was described as sensational and Sharkey was considered to have been in his best form with a clear advantage.

On March 24, 1919, Sharkey lost to Jackie "Kid" Wolfe in a ten-round newspaper decision of the Bridgeport Standard Telegram at the Grand Theater in Cleveland, Ohio.

On May 3, 1920, Sharkey lost to Jewish boxer Young Montreal, aka Morris Billingkoff, in a twelve-round points decision at Infantry Hall in Providence, Rhode Island. Young Montreal was a skilled opponent who was a contender for the World Bantamweight Championship for a ten-year period.

Championship fights

Sharkey first defeated Pete Herman in a six-round newspaper decision of two local newspapers at the National Athletic Club in Philadelphia on May 4, 1918. The victory over the reigning bantamweight champion was described as "a clean cut lacing", and several newspapers agreed Sharkey had the advantage in the bout. Due to a smaller house than expected, Sharkey was poorly compensated for his victory. Sharkey was described as the aggressor through most of the bout and able to stand punch for punch with the champion.  On September 2, 1918, Sharkey again fared well against Herman in a non-title six-round match at the Olympia Club in Philadelphia although it ended in a no-decision and more newspapers gave the advantage to Herman.  Sharkey was described as the aggressor and always forcing the pace, though more newspapers felt Herman deserved to win having better timed and more effective punches.<ref>Sharkey fared will in "Jack Sharkey Wins", The Philadelphia Inquirer", Philadelphia, Pennsylvania, pg. 11, 3 September 1918</ref> The fight was close and Sharkey made Herman extend himself.

Championship
Sharkey briefly claimed the World Bantamweight Championship on August 15, 1919, in a ten-round newspaper decision against Herman in a no-decision bout in Milwaukee, Wisconsin, though the title was not unified at the time, and Sharkey won by a fairly close margin. Sharkey's claim was not recognized at the time, as he would have had to win by knockout or technical knockout to take the title, or to have won by the decision of a referee.  Tt majority of newspaper reports gave Sharkey the edge.The bout was close in "Jack Sharkey Gets Decision Over Champ Pete Herman", The Gazette Times, Pittsburgh, Pennsylvania, pg. 14, 16 August 1919  On September 15, 1919, Sharkey again had the edge over Herman in a World Bantamweight Championship match in Detroit, Michigan in a ten-round newspaper decision by the Detroit Free Press, though it was fairly close. According to one source, Sharkey was the aggressor, though Herman landed the more telling blows. On September 11, 1920, Sharkey again defeated Herman in a non-title, fifteen-round newspaper decision of the Chicago Tribune in East Chicago, Indiana, though Herman held the World Bantamweight Championship at the time. Sharkey claimed fouls in the fifth and seventh rounds which were not allowed by the referee. Sharkey was the aggressor throughout which earned him the advantage according to several newspapers. Sharkey's claim to the title was stripped on September 11, 1920.

Jimmy Wilde fight
On December 6, 1919, Sharkey defeated British champion Jimmy Wilde in a ten-round newspaper decision of the Milwaukee Journal before a crowd close to 8,000 at the Auditorium in Milwaukee, Wisconsin. Sharkey was considered a decisive winner, taking eight of the ten rounds according to the newspapermen at ringside.  Sharkey's blows were said to land more frequently and with greater force. Sharkey's win was at least a minor upset as Wilde led in the early betting 2 to 1."Yankee Wins Over Briton", The Daily Gate City and Constitution Democrat, Keokuk, Iowa, pg. 6, 8 December 1919 Sharkey's purse was $20,000 and he achieved notoriety that would help him command more for his future bouts. An exceptional opponent, Wilde would take the British and European Flyweight Championships in that year, and the World Flyweight Championship by 1920.

Charles Ledoux fight
On October 15, 1920, Sharkey defeated French boxer Charles Ledoux in a fifteen-round points decision at Madison Square Garden.  In his career, Ledoux would take both the European and French bantamweight championships. Sharkey appeared to have a clear advantage in the first three rounds and Ledoux was very briefly down in the second.Edgren, Robert, "Jack Sharkey Wins Decision Over Game Charley Ledoux", The Evening World, New York, New York, pg. 8, 16 October 1920

Johnny Buff fight
On November 10, 1921, Sharkey lost to Johnny Buff in a fifteen-round World Bantamweight Championship by points decision at Madison Square Garden. In the close and exciting fight, Sharkey had five rounds, six went to Buff, and four were even. Both boxers took the lead at times, but Buff finished stronger. The Des Moines Register called it "as rousing a battle as ever you'd wish to see." Most newspapers gave the fight to Buff, who held the World Bantamweight title at the time. The New York Times gave Sharkey the seventh, eighth and ninth rounds, while Buff took eleven of the remaining rounds, with one even. The final rounds seemed to clearly belong to Buff.Peglar, Westbrook, "Johnny Buff Wins Over Jack Sharkey", The Des Moines Register, Des Moines, Iowa, pg. 4, 11 November 1921 Sharkey had lost to Buff on January 15, 1920, in an eight-round newspaper decision of the Jersey Journal in Jersey City, New Jersey.

Johnny Dundee fight

On July 6, 1922, Sharkey lost to Johnny Dundee in a fifteen-round points decision of a Junior Lightweight Championship bout at Ebbets Field in Brooklyn with an attendance of around 15,000. Sharkey was down briefly in the fourth and again in the fifteenth in what several boxing critics considered only a modest showing for Dundee. The New York Evening World wrote that Dundee was "losing his fighting fire", by allowing the bout to go fifteen rounds. The Evening World considered Dundee to have taken every round, though Sharkey made a strong showing in the early part of the fourth.  The Evening World described the fighting as somewhat refrained though there was a stronger showing in the fourth and fourteenth rounds.  Though Sharkey came out strong in the fourteenth with a blow to Dundee's jaw, Dundee answered and the close exchange was short lived, with both boxers fighting with more reserve through the fifteenth. The bout was quite exciting and Sharkey was said to excel at infighting having a reach advantage over Dundee. In the early betting, at least among New York newspapers like the New York Tribune, Dundee seemed a clear favorite. The fight was close according to some newspapers and pushed Dundee to his limits, though he won "by a shade".  Sharkey never again competed for a world championship."Buff Makes Sharkey Go Limit to Win By Shade", Reading Times, Reading, Pennsylvania, pg. 15, 17 January 1920

Fighting at 127 pounds as a junior lightweight, on June 19, 1923, Sharkey lost to Pete Zivic at Queensboro Stadium in Queens, New York in a twelve-round points decision. Zivic was a competent junior lightweight, but Sharkey's record included many losses after his loss to Johnny Dundee on July 6, 1922. Sharkey had nearly a six-pound weight advantage over Zivic though he lacked a few inches in reach.

Frankie Fasano fight and aftermath
On December 2, 1924, Sharkey lost on a second round disqualification against Frankie Fasano when he reportedly and uncharacteristically attacked the referee. He had claimed to be a victim of a foul which the referee disallowed. According to the New York Times'', the event greatly disquieted the audience. After striking referee Eddie Purdy in the jaw, his boxing license was revoked the following day and he did not box for the remainder of the year. He boxed in New York four months later in April 1925. On May 14, 1925, he lost again to Fasano in a ten-round points decision at Manhattan Casino in New York after being reinstated. He lost his momentum by the second round.

Retirement from boxing, 1926
Sharkey retired from boxing around May 1926, with a ten-round points decision loss to Young Mulligan in Norwalk, Connecticut.  He had lost two prior bouts by newspaper decision since September 1925, as well as a third-round TKO to Jewish boxer Red Chapman on October 23, 1925. In September 1927, the talented Chapman would lose to Benny Bass in a close bout for the NBA World Featherweight Championship in Philadelphia.

Sharkey was twenty-eight years old when he retired from the ring. He died on March 1, 1970, at the age of 72.

Professional boxing record
All information in this section is derived from BoxRec, unless otherwise stated.

Official record

All newspaper decisions are officially regarded as “no decision” bouts and are not counted in the win/loss/draw column.

Unofficial record

Record with the inclusion of newspaper decisions in the win/loss/draw column.

References

External links
 

1897 births
1970 deaths
Boxers from New York (state)
Bantamweight boxers
World bantamweight boxing champions
American male boxers
American people of Italian descent
Italian emigrants to the United States